Lyciasalamandra billae, the bay Lycian salamander, is a species of salamander in the family Salamandridae found only in Turkey. Its natural habitats are temperate forests and Mediterranean-type shrubby vegetation.
It is threatened by habitat loss.

References

billae
Endemic fauna of Turkey
Taxonomy articles created by Polbot
Amphibians described in 1987
Taxobox binomials not recognized by IUCN